Donald Jackson may refer to:

Donald Jackson (archer) (1932–2009), Canadian Olympic archer
Donald Jackson (figure skater) (born 1940), Canadian figure skater
Donald Jackson (calligrapher) (born 1938), English calligrapher
Don Jackson (American football) (born 1993), American football running back for the Green Bay Packers
Donald deAvila Jackson (1920–1968), American psychiatrist
Donald Dean Jackson (1919–1987), American journalist and historian
Donald L. Jackson (1910–1981), U.S. Representative from California
Donald G. Jackson (1943–2003), American filmmaker
Don Jackson (ice hockey) (born 1956), retired ice hockey player
Donald Jackson (pair skater) (born 1986), Canadian pair skater who won gold at the 2007–2008 ISU Junior Grand Prix
Don Jackson (radio personality) (died 2020), Canadian radio personality
Donald Jackson (Canadian politician) (born 1930), member of the Legislative Assembly of Ontario